The Timothy J. McCarthy Building (also known as Taft Building or the Marble Front Building) located at 24 3rd Street NW in Faribault, Minnesota.

Description and history 
The building was built in 1884 in the Italianate style. Owner T. J. McCarthy had immigrated from Ireland to Faribault, where he attended Shattuck School. McCarthy was the part-owner of a brickyard, and he later purchased the Faribault Marble Works with partner J. H. Nightengale. McCarthy also operated a mortuary in conjunction with his marble and granite business. The building has the only polished marble facade in Faribault.

It was listed on the National Register of Historic Places on August 3, 1990.

References

Buildings and structures in Faribault, Minnesota
Commercial buildings completed in 1884
Commercial buildings on the National Register of Historic Places in Minnesota
Italianate architecture in Minnesota
National Register of Historic Places in Rice County, Minnesota